This is a list of video and pinball games released by Data East.

Video games

Arcade

Super Break (1978, Data East's first game)
Space Fighter (1978)
Super Break 2 (1978)
Astro Fighter (1979)
Mad Alien (1980, a.k.a. Mad Rider and Highway Chase)
Sengoku Ninja Tai (1980)
Terranean (1980)
Astro Fantasia (1981)
Manhattan (1981)
Tournament Pro Golf  (1981, a.k.a. Pro Golf and 18 Hole Pro Golf)
Treasure Island (1981)
BurgerTime (1982)
Bump 'n' Jump (1982)
Disco No. 1 (1982)
Lock 'n' Chase (1982)
Mission-X (1982)
Pro Tennis (1982)
Boomer Rang'r (1983)
Tag Team Wrestling (1983)
Pro Bowling (1983)
Pro Soccer (1983)
Rootin' Tootin''' (1983, a.k.a. La-Pa-Pa)Super Doubles Tennis (1983)B-Wings (1984)Cobra Command (1984)Kamikaze Cabbie (1984, a.k.a. Yellow Cab)Karate Champ (1984)Kung-Fu Master (1984)Liberation (1984, a.k.a. Dual Assault)Mysterious Stones (1984)Peter Pepper's Ice Cream Factory (1984)Scrum Try (1984)Zaviga (1984)Metal Clash (1985)Performan (1985)Ring King (1985)Road Blaster (1985)Shootout (1985)BreakThru (1986)Darwin 4078 (1986)Express Raider (1986, a.k.a. Western Express)Fire Trap (1986)Last Mission (1986)Lock-On (1986)Shackled (1986)Side Pocket (1986)Zippy Bug (1986)Captain Silver (1987)Garyo Retsuden (1987)Gondomania (1987)Heavy Barrel (1987)Karnov (1987)Oscar: Psycho-Nics (1987)The Real Ghostbusters (1987)SRD: Super Real Darwin (1987)Wonder Planet (1987)Bad Dudes Vs. DragonNinja (1988)Bloody Wolf (1988)Chelnov (1988)Cobra Command (1988)Hippodrome (1988, a.k.a. Fighting Fantasy)RoboCop (1988)Stadium Hero (1988)Act-Fancer: Cybernetick Hyper Weapon (1989)Midnight Resistance (1989)Sly Spy (1989)Vapor Trail: Hyper Offence Formation (1989)The Cliffhanger: Edward Randy (1990)Gate of Doom (1990)Super BurgerTime (1990)Trio The Punch - Never Forget Me... (1990)Batman (1990) (Developed By Atari Games and Midway Games) Captain America and the Avengers (1991)China Town (1991)Desert Assault (1991)Hop A Tic Tac Toe (1991)Joe & Mac (1991)Lemmings (1991, Arcade prototype version)Mutant Fighter (1991)RoboCop 2 (1991)Rohga: Armor Force (1991)Tumblepop (1991)Two Crude (1991)Boogie Wings (1992)Diet Go! Go! (1992)Dragon Gun (1992)Nitro Ball (1992)Wizard Fire (1992)Fighter's History (1993)Heavy Smash (1993)High Seas Havoc (1993)Night Slashers (1993)Spinmaster (1993)Karnov's Revenge (1994)Joe & Mac Returns (1994)Locked 'n Loaded (1994)Street Slam (1994)Tattoo Assassins (1994)(Cancelled)Windjammers (1994)Avengers in Galactic Storm (1995)Backfire! (1995)Dunk Dream 95 (1995, a.k.a. Hoops 96)Outlaws of the Lost Dynasty (1995)Ghostlop (1996)Magical Drop II (1996)Mausuke no Ojama the World (1996)Skull Fang Ku-u-ga Gaiden (1996)Stadium Hero '96 (1996)  Air Walkers (1996)Magical Drop III (1997)

Famicom/Nintendo Entertainment SystemB-Wings (1985)BurgerTime (1985)Bump 'n' Jump (1986)Karate Champ (1986)Tag Team Pro Wrestling (1986)BreakThru (1987)Golf Club: Birdie Rush (1987)Karnov (1987)Kid Niki: Radical Ninja (1987)Ring King (1987)Santa Claus no Takarabako (1987)Side Pocket (1987)Tantei Jingūji Saburō: Shinjuku Chūō Kōen Satsujin Jiken (1987)Tōjin Makyō Den: Heracles no Eikō (1987)Captain Silver (1988)Cobra Command (1988)Donald Land (1988)Pachinko Grand Prix (1988)Rampage (1988)Soccer League - Winner's Cup (1988)Tantei Jingūji Saburō: Kiken na Futari - Zenpen (1988)Tantei Jingūji Saburō: Yokohama-kō Renzoku Satsujin Jiken (1988)Al Unser Jr.'s Turbo Racing (1989)Bad Dudes (1989)Heracles no Eikō II: Titan no Metsubō (1989)Home Run Night (1989)Tantei Jingūji Saburō: Kiken na Futari - Kōhen (1989)Caveman Games (1990)Daikaijyu Deburasu (1990)Dash Galaxy in the Alien Asylum (1990)Heavy Barrel (1990)Home Run Night '90 (1990)Tantei Jingūji Saburō:Toki no Sugiyuku Mama ni... (1990)Little Magic (1990)Werewolf: The Last Warrior (1990)Bo Jackson Baseball (1991)Captain America and the Avengers (1991)Dark Lord (1991)Metal Max (1991)Joe & Mac (1992)

Game Boy seriesLock 'n' Chase (1990)Side Pocket (1990)Nail 'n' Scale (1990)BurgerTime Deluxe (1991)Heracles no Eikō: Ugokidashita Kamigami (1992)Tumblepop (1992)Joe & Mac (1993)Captain America and the Avengers (1994)Magical Drop (2000)

 Super NES Joe & Mac (1991)Congo's Caper (1992)Heracles no Eikō III: Kamigami no Chinmoku (1992)Super Birdie Rush (1992)ABC Monday Night Football (1993)Captain America and the Avengers (1993)Dragon's Lair  (1993)Metal Max 2 (1993)Sengoku (1993)Shadowrun (1993)Side Pocket (1993)Fighter's History (1994)Heracles no Eikō IV: Kamigami kara no Okurimono (1994)Joe & Mac 2: Lost in the Tropics (1994)Fighter's History: Mizoguchi Kiki Ippatsu!! (1995)Magical Drop (1995)Metal Max Returns (1995)Motteke Oh! Dorobou (1995)Magical Drop II (1996)

AmigaBatman: The Caped Crusader (1988)Chamber of the Sci-Mutant Priestess (1989)ABC Wide World of Sports Boxing (1991)

PC Engine/TurboGrafx-16Bloody Wolf (1989)Makai Hakkenden Shada (1989)Winning Shot (1989)Drop Rock Hora Hora (1990)Override (1991)Silent Debuggers (1991)

Sega Master SystemCaptain Silver (1988)

Mega Drive/GenesisSRD: Super Real Darwin (1990)Midnight Resistance (1991)Vapor Trail: Hyper Offence Formation (1991)Captain America and the Avengers (1992)Chelnov (1992)Side Pocket (1992)Two Crude Dudes (1992)Dashin' Desperados (1993)High Seas Havoc (1994)Joe & Mac (1994)Mega Turrican (1994)OutRunners (1994)Minnesota Fats: Pool Legend (1995)

Sega Game GearCaptain America and the Avengers (1993)Side Pocket (1994)

Mega LDStrahl (1993)

 Sega CD Panic! (1994)

Sega SaturnDark Legend (1995)Magical Drop (1995)Minnesota Fats: Pool Legend (1995)Strahl (1995)Creature Shock (1996)Defcon 5 (1996)Magical Drop II (1996)Skull Fang (1996)Suiko Enbu: Fuunsaiki (1996)Tantei Jingūji Saburō:Mikan no Report (1996)Wizardry: VI and VII Complete (1996)Karnov's Revenge (1997)Magical Drop III (1997)Rohga: Armor Force (1997)Side Pocket 3 (1997)Voice Idol Maniacs: Pool Bar Story (1997)Doukoku Soshite... (1998)Doukoku Soshite... Final Edition (1998)Tantei Jingūji Saburō:Yume no Owari ni (1998)

DreamcastRevive... Sosei (1999)

Neo Geo AESKarnov's Revenge (1994)Spinmaster (1994)Street Slam (1994)Windjammers (1994)Ghostlop (1996)Magical Drop II (1996)Magical Drop III (1997)

Neo Geo CDKarnov's Revenge (1994)Street Slam (1995)Windjammers (1995)Magical Drop II (1996)

Neo Geo Pocket ColorMagical Drop Pocket (1999)

PlayStationOutlaws of the Lost Dynasty (1995)Creature Shock (1996)Defcon 5 (1996)Rohga: Armor Force (1996)Tantei Jingūji Saburō:Mikan no Report (1996)Magical Drop III: Yokubari Tokudaigou! (1997)Soukyugurentai: Oubushutsugeki (1997)Voice Idol Collection: Pool Bar Story (1997)Tantei Jingūji Saburō:Yume no Owari ni (1998)Side Pocket 3 (1998)Magical Drop III (1999)Magical Drop F - Daibouken Mo Rakujyanai! (1999)Tantei Jingūji Saburō: Early Collection (1999)Tantei Jingûji Saburô: Tomoshibi ga kienu ma ni (1999)

WonderswanMagical Drop for WonderSwan  (1999)Side Pocket for WonderSwan (1999)

MobileCaveman Ninja (Joe and Mac)  (2021)

Pinball games
Aaron Spelling (mod of Lethal Weapon 3)
Arnon Milchan (mod of Last Action Hero)
The Adventures of Rocky and Bullwinkle and Friends (1993)
Back to the Future: The Pinball (1990)
Batman (1991)
Checkpoint (1991)
Guns N' Roses (1994)
Hook (1992)
Joel Silver (mod of Star Trek)
Jurassic Park (1993)
King Kong (1990)
Laser War (1987)
Last Action Hero (1993)
Lethal Weapon 3 (1992)
Maverick (1994)
Michael Jordan (mod of Lethal Weapon 3)
Monday Night Football (1989)
Phantom of the Opera (1990)
Richie Rich (mod of The Who's Tommy Pinball Wizard)
RoboCop (1989)
Secret Service (1988)
The Simpsons (1990)
Star Trek (1991)
Star Wars (1992)
Tales from the Crypt (1993)
Teenage Mutant Ninja Turtles (1991)
Time Machine (1988)
The Who's Tommy Pinball Wizard (1994)
WWF Royal Rumble (1994)

References

Data East video games
Data East